The School of Cinema is housed in the College of Liberal & Creative Arts at San Francisco State University (SFSU).  It is located in San Francisco, California, USA and offers a Bachelor of Arts, a Master of Arts, and Master of Fine Arts in Cinema.  The program has been frequently included in the annual "Top 25 American Film Schools" rankings published by The Hollywood Reporter.

The curriculum combines film production, screenwriting, animation and critical theory in both its undergraduate and graduate programs.  The School offers a wide range of courses in digital, interactive, and experimental production, as well as cinema history, theory, and criticism.  Currently there are approximately 950 students enrolled, the majority in the undergraduate program.

Facilities

The department's production and research facilities include:

Animation Lab
Coppola Theater
Critical Studies Center
Digital Cinema Lab
DOC Film Institute
Faculty/DOCFilm Post-Production Studio
Foley Studio
Optical Printing Studio
Queer Cinema Project
Post-production Studios
Sound stage
Veteran Documentary Corps

History

The School of Cinema was founded amid the political activism and artistic experimentation of the 1960s. Originally part of the Broadcast and Electronic Arts Department, Cinema faculty such as Jim Goldner successfully made the case to the university that filmmaking was both an art and industry, and that it needed to be housed in a separate Department.

In the 1990s, a new facility was constructed, featuring a 2500 square foot shooting stage, greatly enlarging the department's post-production studios and labs, and beginning the transition from analogue to digital processes. A new screening room, the Coppola Theater (FA 101), equipped for both 16mm and 35mm projection and featuring a Dolby sound system, was named for former Dean of Creative Arts, August Coppola, whose efforts were primarily responsible for funding the new building.  Digital upgrades to sound and editing labs have further modernized the department's production facilities.

In more recent times, filmmakers as diverse as Francis Ford Coppola and Ken Burns have given talks, master classes and screenings of their work. Alumni have also returned to the Department to critique student work, to provide internships, and to continue the tradition of giving back to their community. And the Department has long-standing relationships with the San Francisco Film Society and Bay Area Video Coalition (BAVC), among many other San Francisco-based film production and cultural institutions.

Today, students take classes from a diverse group of over 20 tenure-track and tenured faculty committed to exploring all dimensions of film and media production and studies - from independent filmmaking to experimental animation to critical and cultural theory.  Faculty continue to make films, write books on film and media culture, and give talks around the world on such diverse topics as Chinese Cinema, digital culture, television aesthetics, experimental narrative, screenwriting and the politics of documentary film.

Current Faculty 
LINK TO FACULTY BIOS
Daniel Bernardi: Professor (Media and Culture)
Scott Boswell: Associate Professor (Fiction Filmmaking)
Steve Choe: Associate Professor (Media and Culture)
Rafael Flores: Assistant Professor (Filmmaking)
Martha Gorzycki: Professor (Animation)
Artel Great: Assistant Professor (George and Judy Marcus Endowed Chair in African American Cinema Studies)
Laura Green: Assistant Professor (Filmmaking)
Julian Hoxter: Professor (Screenwriting')
Pat Jackson: Professor (Filmmaking)
Aaron Kerner: Professor (Media and Culture)
Steve Kovacs: Professor (Media and Culture; Screenwriting)
Jenny Lau: Professor (Media and Culture)
Joseph McBride: Professor (Media and Culture; Screenwriting) 
Mihaela Mihailova: Assistant Professor (Animation) 
Rosa Sungjoo Park: Assistant Professor (Sound)
Elizabeth Ramirez-Soto: Assistant Professor (Documentary)
Ben Ridgway: Professor (Animation)
R.L. Rutsky: Professor (Media and Culture)
Rae Shaw: Assistant Professor (Filmmaking)
Britta Sjogren: Professor (Filmmaking; Media and Culture)
Greta Snider: Professor (Filmmaking)
Bethany Sparks: Assistant Professor (Sound)
Johnny Symons: Associate Professor (Documentary Filmmaking)
Mayuran Tiruchelvam: Assistant Professor (George and Judy Marcus Endowed Chair in Social Justice Filmmaking)
Weimin Zhang: Professor (Cinematography, Documentary Filmmaking)

Distinguished Alumni 
Sean Afshar, Special Effects
Tory Belleci, Filmmaker, Special Effects Department
Gloria Borders, Sound Engineer (Academy Award winner)
Christopher Boyes, Sound Designer, Skywalker Sound (Academy Award winner)
Curtis Choy, Sound Engineer
George Csicsery, Documentary Filmmaker
Arthur Dong, Documentary Director, Screenwriter, Producer (Academy Award nominee)
Anthony C. Ferrante, Director, Producer, Writer
Weston Green, Digital Filmmaker (Emmy Award Winner, Webby Honoree )
Barbara Hammer, Filmmaker (Lambda Literary Award)
Sarah K. Hellström, Visual Effects
Masoud Jafari Jozani, Director, Screenwriter, Producer
Justin Kelly, Director
Lexi Leban, Executive Director, San Francisco Jewish Film Festival
Delroy Lindo, Actor, Theater Director
Steven Okazaki, Documentary Filmmaker
Marcy Page, Producer, Director
Anthony Peckham, Screenwriter/Producer
Jonas Rivera, Producer, Pixar Animation Studios (Academy Award winner)
Jay Rosenblatt, Filmmaker
Corey Sienega, Producer
Lisanne Skyler, Screenwriter, Director
Ethan Van der Ryn, Sound Editor (Academy Award winner)
Steve Zaillian, Screenwriter (Academy Award winner for Schindler's List)

Former Faculty 

Jameson Goldner  
Patricia Amlin: Emeritus
Jason Jakaitis: Full-Time Lecturer (Documentary, New Media, Experimental)
Scott Barlett
Tim Blaskovich
Robert Bell: Emeritus
Mel Carlsen
Larry Clark (filmmaker)
Angela Davis
Cheryl Dunye
Tarek Elhaik
John Fell:  Emeritus
Pat Ferrero: Emeritus
Douglas Gallez
Jennifer Hammett
Dave Hilberman
Karen Holmes: Emeritus
Margo Kasdan
Jim Kitses: Emeritus
Ron Levaco: Emeritus
Time Lewis
Robert Lewis: Emeritus
Allie Light
Akira Lippit
Fred Padula
Jan Millsapps: Emerita
IIRC Trinh T. Minh-ha
Katie Morrissey
Jesse Moss
Alexander Nevill
Bill Nichols: Emeritus
Joan Reynertson
Irving Saraf
Chris Saxton
Celine Shimizu 
Trinh T. Minh-ha
Stephen Ujlaki

Organizations
Animation Society
Cinema Collective
Black Film Club
Queer Cinema Coalition
Delta Kappa Alpha

References

Martinez Mayra, 40 years of Cinema at SF State. Golden Gate Xpress. 04/22/07
SFSU Film & Television Alumni Hot Shots

External links:  SFSU

School of Cinema - San Francisco State University

Film schools in California
San Francisco State University
University subdivisions in California
Educational institutions established in 1967
1967 establishments in California